Miss Grand Ghana is a Ghanaian female beauty pageant, founded in 2020 by Accra-based pageant organizer Legacy Pageants Limited, chaired by Sandy Amissah. The winners of the contest represent the country at its parent international stage, Miss Grand International, while the rest of its finalists are sent to compete on other international platforms. In 2022, the license of Miss Grand Ghana was taken over by Abena Appiah, a former Miss Grand International, who has owned and run the contest annually since then.

The reigning Miss Grand Ghana is Priscilla Bossman of the Central Region, who was crowned on July 8 at the National Theatre of Ghana in Accra. She later represented the country at Miss Grand International 2022 in Indonesia, but went unplaced. Previously, Ghana participated in the Miss Grand International pageant twice, in 2015 and 2018, but both of them also got a non-placement.

History
Since the inception of Miss Grand International, Ghana has sent three contestants to participate: the first in 2015 by a Dutch-born Ghanaian "Charlee Berbicks", followed by a former Queen of Peace Africa 2015 "Helen Demay Matey" in 2018, and the most recent by Priscilla Bossman, the winner of the Miss Grand Ghana 2022 pageant; but none of them qualified for the top 20 finalists round.

In 2020, on August 9, Legacy Pageants Limited, under the direction of Sandy Amissah, held the first Miss Grand Ghana pageant at Christ the King Parish in Accra. The event was hosted by an actor, Achieva Evans, and featured seven candidates representing seven country regions, of whom "Pamela Clement" of the Western Region was named the winner; however, she did not join the international competition  for undisclosed reasons.

The national finalists for such an edition were determined through the face-to-face audition held on 17 April in Accra, and then the qualified candidates were additionally assigned to represent one of the country's regions. The grand final of the contest was later held on 8 July at the National Theatre in Accra, and consisted of 16 finalists representing 16 country's regions, of whom Priscilla Bossman of the Central Region was announced the winner. In addition to Miss Grand International 2022, the finalists of the contest were also sent to other international competitions, such as Miss Asia Pacific International and Queen Beauty Universe.

Editions
The Miss Grand Ghana pageant was held twice in 2020 and 2022, the following table is the competition detail of such contests.

International competition

The main finalists of the Miss Grand Ghana pageant have been sent to represent the country in various international contests, the following is a list of international contests, with participants from Miss Grand Ghana as contestants based on the year the pageant was held, the competition results included.

National finalists
The following list is the national finalists of the Miss Grand Ghana pageant, as well as the competition results.

Color keys
 Declared as the winner
 Ended as a runner-up
 Ended as a semifinalist
 Ended as a quaterfinalist
 Did not participate
 Withdraw during the competition

See also
 Miss Ghana
 Miss Universe Ghana
 Miss International Ghana

References

External links
 

Ghana
Beauty pageants in Ghana
Recurring events established in 2020
2020 establishments in Ghana